Eurocreme is a European company based in London, England, that specializes in the production and distribution of gay pornographic films, generally featuring twinks, although it has also released a number of series devoted to men of more diverse appearance.

History
The company was founded by director Max Lincoln, whose first film was DreamBoy (2002).  In 2004, the company set up a joint venture with Netherlands-based distributor Eurocreme BV, which used the "Eurocreme Sales" brand to market a portfolio of mostly bareback-sex movies from AVI Production, Prague, released under various brand names.

In late 2008, both companies split their affairs but still are partnered in a United States-based distribution joint venture, Euro Media Distributors.

In 2009, Eurocreme partnered with Alphamalemedia.com, a UK-based muscle studio owned by porn star Trojan Rock. This partnership enabled the company to offer a large portfolio of product to appeal to a wide audience.

In April 2010, Eurocreme announced that it had signed a boy band named Boy Banned.  This announcement sparked widespread speculation that Eurocreme was adopting a diversification strategy.

Production
Best known for the films directed by Lincoln, Simon Booth, Marc Reardon and Maxwell B, Eurocreme produces eleven separate brands. Of these, the flagship remains the "Boy" series, most recently "CountryBoy" and "DirtyBoy". Eurocreme's other brands include the series Rudeboiz, which shows more intense gay sex between rough British young men, known as chavs. Eurocreme has also released a number of titles under the "Indieboyz" label, devoted to sex between young men styled in the indie-pop fashion popular in the UK. Performers in the "Hung Ladz" brand have larger-than-average penises. The company has branched into mainstream film making with the release of VGL – Hung!, directed by Maxwell B.

Websites
The company owns and operates a number of free and commercial websites, including:
 eurocreme.com
 eurocremestore.com
 eurocreme.tv
 rudeboiz.com
 clubeurocreme.com

Brands
It various brands include:

 Bulldog Red
 Bulldog XXX
 Butt Sluts
 Dads Fucks Lads
 DirtyLadz
 DreamBoy
 Eurocremies
 First Crush
 Garcons XXX
 Hung Ladz
 Indie Boyz
 Porn Academy
 Rudeboiz
 Str8Boiz
 Troy XXX

Notable performers

 Kai Cruz
 Matt Hughes
 Cameron Jackson
 Will Jamieson
 JP Dubois
 Andy O'Neill
 Ashley Ryder
 Alex Stevens 
 Mason Wyler

See also

List of film production companies
List of pornographic movie studios

References

External links
 Eurocreme's website
 Euro Media Distribution site
 Eurocreme TV (VOD) site
 Eurocreme Store site
 Eurocreme Blog site
 Max Lincoln's (Eurocreme Founder) Blog site
 AlphaMale Media website

Mass media companies established in 2002
Gay pornographic film studios
Mass media companies based in London
Privately held companies of the United Kingdom
2002 establishments in England
Gay male pornography websites